Several naval ships of Germany were named Magdeburg after the city of Magdeburg, Germany:

 , a   light cruiser, launched 1911
 :   (Type 130) corvette, launched 2006

German Navy ship names